Tarun Dey is a retired Indian football defender who represented India at the 1984 Asian Cup. He also played for East Bengal Club and was awarded the Man of the tournament of the 1985 Coca Cola Cup.

Dey is also a qualified AFC coach and managed East Bengal youth team as assistant coach.

Club career
He joined Calcutta Football League club East Bengal in 1982 and captained the team in 1986–87. They later won Federation Cup and qualified for 1985–86 Asian Club Championship. As part of Central Asia Zone (tournament was named "Coca-Cola Cup"), the club managed by legendary footballer and Olympian P. K. Banerjee, defeated New Road Team by 7–0, Abahani Krira Chakra 1–0, Club Valencia 9–0. Dey was awarded the Man of the Tournament award.

Honours
East Bengal
Federation Cup: 1985
IFA Shield: 1984, 1986, 1990, 1991, 1994
Durand Cup: 1989, 1990, 1991, 1993
Calcutta Football League: 1985, 1987, 1988, 1989, 1991, 1993
Rovers Cup: 1990, 1994
Coca Cola Cup: 1985
Bordoloi Trophy: 1992
All Airlines Gold Cup: 1987, 1988, 1990, 1992
Darjeeling Gold Cup: 1985
SSS Trophy: 1989, 1991
Sait Nagjee Trophy: 1986
Stafford Cup: 1986

India
 South Asian Games Gold medal: 1987; Bronze medal: 1989

See also
List of East Bengal Club captains

References

Bibliography

Chattopadhyay, Hariprasad (2017). Mohun Bagan–East Bengal . Kolkata: Parul Prakashan.

External links
Stats at RSSSF
Profile at EBRP

Living people
Indian footballers
India international footballers
1984 AFC Asian Cup players
Footballers at the 1986 Asian Games
Association football defenders
Footballers from West Bengal
Year of birth missing (living people)
Asian Games competitors for India
East Bengal Club players
Calcutta Football League players
South Asian Games medalists in football
South Asian Games gold medalists for India
South Asian Games bronze medalists for India